The Green Party of Canada holds a national leadership election every 4 years, as stipulated under the party's current constitution.

Ballots are always mailed out in advance to all Green Party of Canada "members in good standing" - allowing the option of voting by mail to all party members who do not wish to attend the convention in person.

The party uses an instant-runoff voting (IRV) ballot system for the election of its leader and councillors and a standard yes-or-no ballot for voting on constitutional amendments.

Leadership conventions

2000
 2000 Ottawa (University of Ottawa), Joan Russow re-elected (resigned in January 2001, Chris Bradshaw elected by national council meeting in February 2001 as interim leader).

2002
 2002 Montreal (Francophone institute for the blind), no member nominated for leader; Chris Bradshaw chosen to continue on an interim basis.

2003
 February 14, 2003, Jim Harris elected.

2004
 2004 Calgary (Kiwanis camp in foothills), Jim Harris re-elected (first elected by mail ballot 6 months after the Montreal convention).

2006

Held August 24–27, 2006 in Ottawa, Ontario using a One Member One Vote system. On April 24, 2006, incumbent party leader Jim Harris announced he would not be running for re-election. The race was won by Elizabeth May on August 26, 2006.

2020

Held October 3, 2020, in Ottawa, Ontario using a one member, one vote preferential ballot with a none of the above option. Annamie Paul, an activist and lawyer from Toronto, won the election on the eighth round of voting. Her win was described as a win for "the more centrist camp".

2022 

Annamie Paul resigned on November 14, 2021, several weeks after the 2021 Canadian federal election. Held November 19, 2022, in Ottawa, Ontario using a one member, one vote preferential ballot with a none of the above option. Saanich—Gulf Islands MP and former Green Party leader Elizabeth May won the election, after campaigning as part of a joint ticket with Jonathan Pedneault; as co-leadership is not formally recognized in the party’s constitution, Pedneault will become Deputy Leader while the two seek to amend the party constitution.

Leaders of the Green Party of Canada

Trevor Hancock (1983–1984)
Seymour Trieger (1984–1988)
Kathryn Cholette (1988–1990)
Chris Lea (1990–1996)
Wendy Priesnitz (1996–1997)
Harry Garfinkle (interim) (1997)
Joan Russow (1997–2001)
Chris Bradshaw (interim) (2001–2003)
Jim Harris (2003–2006)
Elizabeth May (2006–2019)
Jo-Ann Roberts (interim) (2019–2020)
Annamie Paul (2020–2021)
Amita Kuttner (interim) (2021–2022)
 Elizabeth May (2022–present)

References 

 
Leadership elections
Canada